Albert Jamal McClellan (born June 4, 1986) is a former American football inside linebacker. He played college football at Marshall University from 2005 to 2009, and was signed by the Baltimore Ravens as an undrafted free agent after the 2010 NFL Draft.

High School & College
A native of Lakeland, Florida, McClellan attended Kathleen High School, where he was rated as a two-star recruit by Rivals.com.

McClellan played college football for Marshall. While there he was a three-time All-Conference USA selection, as well as the C-USA Defensive Player of the Year in 2006. He redshirted in 2007 after suffering a torn anterior cruciate ligament in pre-season, an injury that sidelined him for the year.

Professional career

Baltimore Ravens
McClellan was signed by the Baltimore Ravens as an undrafted free agent after the 2010 NFL Draft. McClellan played as the fourth string middle linebacker (Behind Ray Lewis, Jameel McClain, and Dannell Ellerbe). He did not play at all in the 2010 season, but saw limited time the next year.
With an injury to Terrell Suggs and the departure of Jarret Johnson to free agency in 2012, McClellan had a chance to compete for a starting outside linebacker spot with Paul Kruger, Courtney Upshaw, and Sergio Kindle. Upshaw appeared to have the edge for most of training camp, but in the third preseason game, McClellan got the start. He would start 11 games during the season, and would record 49 tackles and a sack, both career highs. The Ravens did go on to win Super Bowl XLVII after they beat the San Francisco 49ers 34-31.

On March 9, 2014, McClellan signed a new two-year contract to remain with the Ravens.

McClellan signed a three-year extension to remain with Baltimore on March 1, 2016.

In 2017 during training camp, McClellan tore his ACL and was ruled out for the season. He was placed on injured reserve on September 1, 2017.

On September 1, 2018, McClellan was released by the Ravens. He was re-signed on September 17, 2018. He was released again on October 30, 2018.

New England Patriots

On November 6, 2018, McClellan was signed by the New England Patriots. In Week 14, McClellan blocked two punts on Dolphins punter Matt Haack.  In the Divisional round of the playoffs against the Los Angeles Chargers, McClellan recovered a fumble off a muffed punt. The Patriots went on to win Super Bowl LIII 13-3 against the Los Angeles Rams to give McClellan his second Super Bowl title.

New York Jets
On August 17, 2019, McClellan was signed by the New York Jets. He was released on September 1, 2019, but was re-signed the next day. He was placed on injured reserve on October 30, 2019, with a concussion.

References

External links
 Baltimore Ravens bio
 Marshall Thundering Herd bio

1986 births
Living people
Sportspeople from Lakeland, Florida
American football defensive ends
American football linebackers
Marshall Thundering Herd football players
Baltimore Ravens players
New England Patriots players
New York Jets players
Players of American football from Florida